Michael Anthony Guendling (born June 18, 1962) is a former American football linebacker in the National Football League for the San Diego Chargers. He played college football at Northwestern University.

Early years
Guendling attended St. Viator High School, where he was a three-year starter at linebacker. He also practiced hockey.

He accepted a football scholarship from Northwestern University. He was named a starter at defensive back as a freshman. As a sophomore, he was moved to outside linebacker, to play in a 3-4 defense. 

As a junior, he had 20 tackles (13 solo), helping the team beat Michigan State University and end a string off 44 consecutive road loses.

As a senior, he had 7 solo tackles (3 for loss), 2 sacks and 4 pass breakups in a 10-8 win against Indiana University. He finished second in school history with 29 career tackles for loss. He also had 3 career interceptions.

He played two seasons with the school's hockey team.

Professional career
Guendling was selected by the San Diego Chargers in the second round (33rd overall) of the 1984 NFL Draft. As a rookie, he was lost for the season after suffering a broken kneecap and knee ligament damage during training camp in July, which forced him to have 3 knee surgeries. 

In 1985, he returned to play in 9 games, limited mostly to special teams and had 7 tackles. In 1986, he suffered an ankle injury. He wasn't able to regain his previous form after his knee injury and was waived on August 20.

Personal life
His son Brian played college football at Texas State University.

References

External links
Mike Guendling Stats

1962 births
Living people
Players of American football from Chicago
American football linebackers
Northwestern Wildcats football players
San Diego Chargers players